On the Shoulders of Giants may refer to:

 Standing on the shoulders of giants, a Western metaphor
 On the Shoulders of Giants (book), a 2002 compilation of scientific texts edited by Stephen Hawking
 On the Shoulders of Giants (film), a 2011 historical sports documentary film